Childish describes something suitable for a child, or something (particularly behavior) that is immature. It may also refer to:

 Billy Childish (born 1959), English artist, writer, and musician
 Childish Gambino (born 1983), American actor, writer, comedian, director, and musician
 Childish Major (born 1991), American rapper and record producer

See also
 Minor (law)